The Menemen Massacre was a massacre of Turkish civilians by the Greek Army on June 16–17, 1919 in the town of Menemen, shortly after the Greek forces landed in nearby Smyrna, as part of the post World War I Greek occupation of Turkey.

Killings
The Ottoman prefect of Menemen, Kemal Bey, and the six gendarmes accompanying him were assassinated by Greek soldiers in the evening of the first day. These deaths became the opening act for further killings carried out on the civilian population of Menemen the following day by a Cretan brigade aided by accomplices from the local Greek minority. The event was described as a massacre by an Inter-Allied Commission of four generals representing the Allied Powers. The commission also said that the massacre was not organized by the Greek Command, but was as a result of the panic and anger of the young troops who were still affected by the Pergamos (Bergama) events and whom their officers were not able to calm. At Pergamos, the Turkish irregulars who retook the city murdered the Turkish inhabitants who had previously welcomed the Greeks, and massacred and tortured their Greek prisoners of war.

The number of casualties among the civilian Turkish population of the town during the single day of June 17 vary between two hundred, according to the October 1919 report drawn up by the Inter-Allied Commission; to one thousand, according to a delegation that arrived the next day (June 18, 1919). Captain Charns, the head of that delegation, contrasted the number of Turkish victims against the non-existence of any Greek wounded, either civilian or military. The October report, prepared by the British officers and medical delegates from the British and Italian consulates in Smyrna, rejected the 1000 casualties figure as an exaggeration, finding that at least 100 had died, and mentioning a French officer's investigation the day after the massacre reporting that 200 Turks had been killed, and 200 injured. The Greek military claimed that they were attacked in the town, but the commission did not give credit to their statements. They found the Greeks alone responsible for the bloodshed. 

The events were protested by the Ottoman Shaykh al-Islām. Demographer Justin McCarthy, rejecting the findings of the Inter-Allied Commission, claimed the massacre was preplanned, indicated by the fact that before the attacks all Greek houses in the city had been marked with white crosses and were not affected by the pillage and destruction.

Contemporary accounts
British Admiral Calthorpe, commenting to London on the fact that some Turks of Menemen had managed to survive, stated:

Celal Bayar, the third Turkish president, wrote the testimony of the local merchant; Çerkes Sefer Efendi.

See also
Greco-Turkish War (1919-1922)
List of massacres during the Greco-Turkish War (1919–22)

Footnotes 

Massacres in 1919
June 1919 events
Greco-Turkish War (1919–1922)
Massacres in the Ottoman Empire
Aftermath of World War I in Turkey
Aidin Vilayet
1919 in the Ottoman Empire 
1919 murders in the Ottoman Empire 
Persecution of Turkish people